Dennis Firestone (born 22 July 1944 in Townsville, Australia) is a former CART driver who raced from 1979 to 1987. He was the 1980 CART Rookie of the Year in finishing 12th in season points, his best season. His best finish in a CART race was a pair of 5th places that season. He made five starts at the Indianapolis 500 with a best finish of 10th in 1981. An accident at Indianapolis in 1987 resulted in a broken neck and ended his racing career. Since his driving days, he has run a California trucking company, and participates in vintage racing events.

American Open Wheel racing results

SCCA National Championship Runoffs

Complete USAC Mini-Indy Series results

American Super Vee Championship

 1978 – 17th
 1979 – 9th
 1980 – 16th

USAC Gold Crown Championship

1981–82 – 24th
1983–84 – 15th

PPG Indycar Series

(key) (Races in bold indicate pole position)

 ''1 Wrecked after qualifying

Indy 500 results

Firestone qualified for the 1986 race, but was forced to withdraw from the field after a serious crash totalled the car during the final Carburetion Day practice.

References

 Driver Database Profile
 Indycar Stats
 Super Vee Stats

1944 births
Champ Car drivers
Indianapolis 500 drivers
Formula Super Vee Champions
Living people
Sportspeople from Townsville
Racing drivers from Queensland
SCCA National Championship Runoffs winners